Lake Pehoé is a surface water body located in Torres del Paine National Park, in the Magallanes Region of southern Chile. The lake is fed mainly by Paine River through the Nordenskjöld Lake, but it also receives the waters of the outlet of Skottsberg Lake.

Paine River waters feeding the Pehoé Lake have emerged from the Salto Grande waterfall. In this upper reach of the Pehoe Lake watershed there are numerous flora and fauna, including grazing wild guanaco.

Gallery

References

Lakes of Chile
Lakes of Magallanes Region
Torres del Paine National Park